Fluffy may refer to:

Characters
 Fluffy (Harry Potter), a giant three-headed dog in the novel Harry Potter and the Sorcerer's Stone
 Fluffy, a beast in a crate that features in a segment of the 1982 film, Creepshow
 Fluffy, a fictional cat character in the Disney comics series Darkwing Duck
 Fluffy, a one-shot character in the episode, "Puppy Love" on the Pajanimals
 Fluffy, a fictional pet elephant belonging to the character Oscar the Grouch on the TV series Sesame Street
 Fluffy, a fictional pet pig belonging to the character Eric Cartman on the TV series South Park

Films
 Fluffy (1965 film), a 1965 film starring Tony Randall and Shirley Jones
 Fluffy, a 2003 short film starring Fred Ewanuick
 Fluffy (2016 film), a 2016 short film

Music
 Fluffy (band), a 1990s UK punk band
 Fluffy, a 1990s band associated with the band Breakfast with Amy
 "Fluffy" (song), a 2013 song by Wolf Alice

Other uses
 Fluffy, nickname for stand-up comedian Gabriel Iglesias
 Fluffy (comics), a 2003 graphic novel by Simone Lia
 Fluffy (footwear), a form of fashion accessory
 Fluffy (UAV), an unmanned aerial vehicle
 Fluffy, a common name for a pet cat
 Fluffy transcription factor, a gene of the mold Neurospora crassa

See also
 Fluff (disambiguation)
 F.L.U.F.F.I., a fictional robot ape belonging to the Bennett family on the TV series Bionic Six
 Fluffing (disambiguation)